The 1934 World Table Tennis Championships men's singles was the eighth edition of the men's singles championship. The Championships were held in December 1933 but are officially listed as the 1934 Championships. 

Viktor Barna defeated Laszlo Bellak in the final, winning three sets to two to secure a third consecutive title.

Results
These are the results:

References

-